Ningbo railway station is a railway station on the Xiaoshan–Ningbo railway, Ningbo–Taizhou–Wenzhou railway and Hangzhou–Ningbo high-speed railway located in Haishu District, Ningbo, Zhejiang, China.

History
The station opened on September 30, 1959. From September 8, 2010, Ningbo East railway station became the place for all passengers departing and arriving in Ningbo while the main railway station described above closed for a two year renovation. Starting from December 28, 2013, Ningbo railway station opened again and Ningbo East railway station became an auxiliary station which stopped transporting passengers.

See also
Ningbo East railway station
Ningbo railway station (Ningbo Rail Transit)

References

Railway stations in China opened in 1959
Railway stations in Zhejiang
Transport in Ningbo